The International Federation of Basque Pelota ( (FIPV)) is the worldwide governing body for Basque pelota, recognized by the International Olympic Committee. It sets the regulations for international competition and organizes the competitions.

Membership
The FIPV is a sports federation recognized by the following confederations.

 International Olympic Committee (IOC)
 Association of the IOC Recognised International Sports Federations (ARISF)
 SportAccord (GAISF)

History
The International federation of Basque pelota was established on May 19, 1929, in Buenos Aires, Argentina brought into being by the French Federation of Basque Pelota, the Spanish Federation of Basque Pelota and the Argentinian Federation of Basque Pelota. Due to the outbreak of World War II and the Spanish Civil War, their activities were restricted until 1945. In 1946 the official modalities regulated by the federation were defined, and its specific rules set for equality of the participant country federations and the international championships.  The headquarters of the federation are currently located in Pamplona, Spain.

Categories
Pala Corta
Rubber-paleta
Paleta-Leather (fronton)
Paleta-Leather (trinquete)
Xare
Cesta Punta
Frontenis
Hand-pelota (fronton)
Hand-pelota (trinquete)

Participating national federations
Source in April 2022:

Regions

 Africa :  , 

Countries
International Federation is constituted by 27 national federations in 2010. In 2022 are 33 members.

Medal table
Basque Pelota World Championships

The current medal table from 1952 to 2018 is as follows:

See also
 Basque Pelota World Cup

References

External links
International Federation of Basque pelota Official Site

Basque pelota federations
Basque pelota
Sports governing bodies in Europe
Sports organizations established in 1929